This is a list of United States Marine Corps logistics groups:

See also

 List of United States Marine Corps divisions
 List of United States Marine Corps aircraft wings

Logistics groups
Marine Corps logistics groups